Helpline! is a 2004 queer short film from the Netherlands written and directed by Joli(e) (pseudonym of Jiro Ghianni).  It is a short experimental animation that was produced for Queeruption 2004.

The film explores the idea of bare-chested-ness. Should everyone in a Western society be able to walk around bare-chested, or just the boys? Is this fair? The director used her/his "pre-testosterone" voice in narrating the voice-over that accompanies the animation.

See also
 List of transgender people
 List of gay, lesbian or bisexual people
 :Category:Transgender people
 Transgender in film and television

External links
Queeruption

Jiro's official website

2004 films
Dutch short films
Dutch LGBT-related films
2000s English-language films